The 1996 United States Senate election in West Virginia was held on November 5, 1996. Incumbent Democratic Senator Jay Rockefeller was easily re-elected to a third consecutive term.

Democratic primary

Candidates
 Bruce Barilla, Christian activist
 Jay Rockefeller, incumbent U.S. Senator

Results

General election

Results

See also 
  1996 United States Senate elections
  1996 West Virginia gubernatorial election

References 

1996 West Virginia elections
West Virginia
1996